Joseph Henry Ham (March 24, 1867 – January 20, 1925) was an Ontario manufacturer and political figure. He represented Brant North in the Legislative Assembly of Ontario from 1914 to 1919 as a Liberal member.

He was born in Brantford, Ontario, the son of W. Ham; his parents came to Canada from England. He served on Brantford City Council. In 1897, he married Mary Dennis. He died in Brantford in 1925.

External links 

History of the county of Brant, FD Reville (1920)
Members of Provincial Parliament, Brantford Public Library

1867 births
1925 deaths
Brantford city councillors
Ontario Liberal Party MPPs